Pagan Muzak is a landmark industrial-noise 7" vinyl released by NON. The release was pressed with 17 tracks of locked grooves and includes an off center hole drilled for an alternate method of play.

Releases
The album was first pressed in 1978 via Graybeat Records. This pressing was a 7" record housed in a 12" sleeve containing 17 tracks on side A, with side B blank. In 1981, Graybeat Records repressed the record, however, both side A and B of the record now included the same 17 tracks. On September 27, 1999, The Grey Area re-pressed the album in an identical manner to the first pressing, with side B blank, and only a standard single center hole.

Track listing
Side A
(untitled)
(untitled)
(untitled)
(untitled)
(untitled)
(untitled)
(untitled)
(untitled)
(untitled)
(untitled)
(untitled)
(untitled)
(untitled)
(untitled)
(untitled)
(untitled)
(untitled)
Side B
Side B is either blank or includes the same tracks as Side A, depending on the pressing.

References

Boyd Rice albums
1978 EPs